The Hyatt Regency Lexington is a 17-story, 366-room hotel located in Lexington, Kentucky. The hotel is located adjacent to Rupp Arena.

Building Facts
It was designed by firms Ellerbe & Company and JR Architect.
Precast prestressed concrete planks were used as the flooring system.
The tower structure utilizes 56 Pratt-type trusses, each 60 feet long, in a staggered configuration.
The hotel contains a seven-story atrium; the glass roof is supported by a space frame.

See also

Cityscape of Lexington, Kentucky

References

Skyscrapers in Lexington, Kentucky
Skyscraper hotels in Kentucky
Hotels established in 1977
Hotel buildings completed in 1977
Hyatt Hotels and Resorts
1977 establishments in Kentucky